No Turning Back: The Story So Far is the first compilation album by Shannon Noll. The album includes tracks from Noll's three studio albums to date, That's What I'm Talking About (2004), Lift (2005) and Turn It Up (2008) and five brand new tracks. The album was released in September 2008 and peaked at number 7 on the ARIA Charts, becoming Noll's fourth consecutive top ten album.

Upon released, Noll said "It was only once we started talking about the idea that it sank in how many singles there's been, from "What About Me" right through to "Loud" and "In Pieces". All these songs mean so much to me and showcase a journey that I've been through with my songwriting and recording, my career in general. It's great to have the new songs on the album, as they are just a taste of what we've got planned for next year!"

Singles
The first single taken from the album was "Summertime", which was originally by 2007 Canadian Idol Brian Melo. The track peaked at number 54 on the ARIA Chart.

Track listing
"Summertime" – 3:42
"Shine" – 3:34
"Lift" – 3:56
"Lonely" – 4:42
"Now I Run" – 3:44
"What About Me" – 3:21
"Drive" – 3:58
"Learn to Fly" – 4:09
"Don't Give Up" (with Natalie Bassingthwaighte) – 4:40
"Loud" – 3:10
"In Pieces" – 3:32
"Tomorrow" – 3:57
"No Turning Back" – 3:43
"Crash" – 3:21
"You're Never Alone" – 5:01
"Sorry Is Just Too Late" (featuring Kari Kimmel) (iTunes exclusive bonus track) – 3:54

Disc 2 (DVD edition)
"What About Me"
"Drive"
"Learn to Fly"
"Lonely"
"Shine"
"Lift"
"Now I Run"
"Loud"
"In Pieces"
"Don't Give Up" (with Natalie Bassingthwaighte)

Omissions
The compilation omits the following singles:
 "Rise Up" with Australian Idol Top 12 (2003) – was a collaborative single and is not considered part of Noll's official discography.
 "New Beginning" (2004) – was a radio-only single release from That's What I'm Talking About.
 "C'mon Aussie C'mon" (2004) – was a charity single only.
 "Twelve Days of Christmas" with Dreamtime Christmas All-Stars (2004) – was a collaborative single and is not considered part of Noll's official discography.
 "Everybody Needs a Little Help" (2008) – was a radio-only single release from Turn It Up.

Charts

Weekly charts

Year-end charts

Release history

References

Shannon Noll albums
Sony BMG compilation albums
2008 greatest hits albums
Compilation albums by Australian artists